Perkins Coie is an American multinational law firm headquartered in Seattle, Washington. Founded in 1912, it is recognized as an Am Law 50 firm. It is the largest law firm headquartered in the Pacific Northwest and has 20 offices across the United States and Asia. The firm provides corporate, commercial litigation, intellectual property, and regulatory legal advice to a broad range of clients, including prominent technology companies like Google, Twitter, Intel, Facebook, and Amazon. In addition to its corporate representation, the firm has represented political clients. The firm is known for its pro bono work.

History 
Founded in 1912, the firm has represented the Boeing Company since the founding of the aerospace company in 1916. Perkins Coie has been named one of Fortune's "100 Best Companies to Work For" for 19 consecutive years and recently ranked #23 on the list.

In 2009, Perkins Coie was awarded the Maleng Advocate for Youth Award by the Center for Children and Youth Justice for its outstanding pro bono legal work.

The firm was an early entrant into fintech and blockchain legal work. Perkins Coie also counsels startups and established tech companies. It launched the Perkins Coie Tech Venture index in 2019, which measures the overall health and trajectory of the emerging growth technology and venture capital ecosystem.

In 2018, Perkins Coie joined the American Bar Association's campaign targeting substance-use disorders and mental health issues among lawyers.

In 2019, the firm became a signatory to the Mansfield Rule, which aims to diversify the leadership of large law firms by broadening the candidate pool for senior management positions.

Clientele
Perkins Coie is counsel of record for the Democratic National Committee, Democratic Leadership Council, the Democratic Senatorial Campaign Committee, and the Democratic Congressional Campaign Committee. Other political clients include most Democratic members of the United States Congress. It has also represented several presidential campaigns, including those of John Kerry, Barack Obama, and Hillary Clinton.  The group's political law practice was founded by Robert Bauer who recruited Marc Elias and made him chair of the group in 2009. Both men have since left the firm.

Notable cases 
The firm represented Amazon in its IPO in 1997.

The firm represented Christine Gregoire in the prolonged litigation surrounding her 2004 Washington gubernatorial election.

A team of Perkins lawyers successfully represented Al Franken in his recount and legal battle over the 2008 Senatorial election in Minnesota.

In 2006, Perkins Coie, led by partner Harry Schneider, represented Salim Ahmed Hamdan, the alleged driver and bodyguard of Osama Bin Laden. The case made its way to the U.S. Supreme Court in Hamdan v. Rumsfeld, in which the Court ruled that the Bush Administration's use of military commissions to try terrorism suspects was unconstitutional.

Perkins Coie worked in the Doe v. Reed case concerning petition signatures in state ballot initiative campaigns, which was argued successfully before the U.S. Supreme Court on April 28, 2010.

In 2010, Perkins Coie sought advisory opinions from the Federal Election Commission declaring that certain Google and Facebook advertisements were covered by the "small items" and "impracticable" exemptions of the law that otherwise requires a political advertisement to include a disclaimer revealing who paid for it.  The commission granted Google's request in a divided vote, and deadlocked on Facebook's request.  According to The New York Times, "Facebook nonetheless proceeded as if it was exempt from the disclaimer requirement". In October 2017, Perkins Coie lobbied to defeat a bill called the "Honest Ads Act", which would require internet companies to disclose who paid for political ads.

Perkins Coie was hired in 2015 as counsel for the presidential campaign of Hillary Clinton. As part of its representation of the Clinton campaign and the Democratic National Committee, Perkins Coie retained the intelligence firm Fusion GPS for opposition research services. Those services began in April 2016 and concluded before the 2016 U.S. presidential election in early November. A notable product of that "opposition research" was the Steele dossier describing alleged attempts by Russia to promote the presidential campaign of Donald Trump. During the campaign, the Clinton campaign and the DNC paid Perkins Coie $5.6 million and $3.6 million respectively.  On October 24, 2017, Perkins Coie released Fusion GPS from its client confidentiality obligation. The Federal Election Commission conducted an investigation into misreported 2016 payments to Perkins Coie and levied a fine of over $100,000, jointly paid by the Democratic National Committee and the Clinton campaign.

Perkins Coie was retained to conduct the independent investigation into potential sexual abuse by Dr. Richard Strauss during the course of his employment with Ohio State University wrestling program. The firm conducted 600 interviews with 520 subjects over the course of a year, an investigation paid for by OSU and expected to cost over $6.2 million by its completion. Of 177 students who personally confirmed abuse by the doctor, and 38 more who confirmed abuse but could not remember which staff person was the perpetrator, according to the university's investigation, 48 were from the wrestling program. Because the report did not specifically mention the failure to address the abuse, or the lack of same, on the part of Republican Congressman Jim Jordan who coached in the programs for eight years while Strauss was there, Jordan claimed he, therefore, had been exonerated by the investigation.

Following the 2020 presidential election, Perkins Coie handled the responses to dozens of lawsuits filed by the Donald Trump campaign, in which Trump sought to overturn Joe Biden's win. Out of 65 such court cases, Perkins Coie prevailed in 64. In 2021, as several Republican-dominated state legislatures passed laws to tighten election procedures and impose stricter voting requirements, Perkins Coie filed suits challenging the new laws, often within hours of the bills being signed.

Notable alumni 
Living alumni of the firm include the 16th Lieutenant Governor of Washington Cyrus Habib; former Attorney General of Washington State Rob McKenna; 9th Circuit Court of Appeals Judges Margaret McKeown, Ronald M. Gould, and Eric D. Miller; Federal Circuit Court of Appeals Judge Tiffany Cunningham; and Oregon Supreme Court Justice Chris Garrett.

In 2009, President Obama appointed Robert Bauer, the chair of the firm's Political Law practice, to become his White House Counsel. Bauer returned to private practice with Perkins Coie in 2011 and departed the firm in 2018.  In 2015, Hillary Clinton named Marc Elias as general counsel to her campaign.

Trump-Russia investigation 
In September 2021, Michael Sussmann, a well-known cybersecurity lawyer at Perkins Coie, was indicted by the John Durham Special Counsel for allegedly making a false statement to the FBI in September 2016. Sussmann resigned from the Perkins Coie after he was charged by the special counsel.  After a jury trial, Sussman was unanimously acquitted in May 2022.

References

External links 
 

Law firms established in 1912
Law firms based in Seattle
Intellectual property law firms
1912 establishments in Washington (state)